Théo Ntamack (born 29 May 2002) is a French rugby union player, who plays for Toulouse.

Biography 
Son of Émile Ntamack and brother of Romain, Théo Ntamack made his way through the Stade Toulousain academy, allowing him to join the federal  during the 2020–21 season.

Having made his first training with the Top 14 squad while being a key player of the France under-20 team, he signed his signed a  3 years contract with the club from Toulouse in May 2022, fully becoming a member of the first team during the following summer friendlies.

He made his Top 14 debut on the 11 September 2022, replacing an injured François Cros on the 58th minute of a 28–8 home defeat of RC Toulon.

References

External links
All.rugby profile

2002 births
Sportspeople from Toulouse
Living people
French rugby union players
Rugby union number eights
Rugby union flankers
Stade Toulousain players
French sportspeople of Cameroonian descent